Women in England are women who live in or are from England. The A Guide to English Culture and Customs described the English women of the United Kingdom to be "equal to men, and should be treated fairly" and that they do "equal share of (...) household tasks and childcare"; but such description may be different in some "more traditional British families" where each couple may have their "own arrangement". As part of the English culture, social drinking is acceptable for women.

History 

The Women's Liberation Movement (WLM) began as recently as the early 1960s. It began with the introduction of birth control pills. It was only provided to women who were wedded under the law to seek out contraceptive pills. Three years after the proposal, women were given the rights to inherit property. Within that same decade, women were granted the rights to have abortions under the Abortion Act. This was deemed legal as long as the pregnancy did not pass the 24th week mark.

In 1970, the call to conference of the Women's Liberation Movement was held to raise awareness. The four main concerns addressed were equal pay between genders, providing fair education and job opportunities for women, coverage of abortion and contraception, and availability of 24-hour nurseries – free of charge.

From there on, a chain reaction of reformation within the United Kingdom emerged. Rape Crisis centers were created, Women's Aid was formed, the Sex Discrimination Act was signed, domestic violence was called out, and conferences were held more than ever to protect women. These movements were the stepping-stone used to scaffold the modern day era of England's feminine culture.

Marriage 
In England many women marry and there are also many who do not. Of those who do not some maintain a relationship with a man while others do not. Premarital sex and living with a significant partner before marriage is considered socially acceptable. Divorce is not uncommon either. Either partner may choose to resign from the marriage, if deemed necessary.

Women in the work force 
Over half of women work a part-time job in England. Statistically, “figures from 2014 show that for every pound a man makes, a woman will only earn 80 pence.”

It has been reported that only 17 percent make up board directors positions out of the companies that were studied.

Education 
The School Workforce found that females are leading in the education field. Women make up most of the faculty within a classroom and as headteachers.

Religion 

For centuries, women have been refused the right to carry a title under Anglican churches. Back in 2014, the Church of England appointed the first woman bishop, Libby Lane.

See also 
 Women in the Victorian era

References

Further reading 
 Women in England: C. 1275-1525 by P. J. P. Goldberg
 The Women of England, Their Social Duties, and Domestic Habits. By Ellis, Sarah Stickney, 1812–1872.
 WOMEN'S STATUS IN MID 19TH-CENTURY ENGLAND A BRIEF OVERVIEW by Helena Wojtczak

External links 

 Women, Gender and Religious Cultures in Britain, 1800-1940, Review in History
 The key men (and a few women) in Britain's arts world, The Observer
 Women in Business in Britain
 England, everyculture.com